Adidja Azim Palmer (born 7 January 1976), better known as Vybz Kartel, is a Jamaican reggae and dancehall recording artist, songwriter, record producer, and entrepreneur. Among his various nicknames, he is referred to as Worl' Boss or Teacha. As summarized by Rolling Stone, he "attained folk-hero status in Jamaica with provocative lyrics, and a mischievous public persona", and "few have captivated [the dancehall] audience – or offended the sensibilities of its detractors – as consistently and thoroughly as Kartel."

Kartel's singles include "Romping Shop" (2009), "Dancehall Hero" (2010), and "Summer Time" (2011). Having collaborated with a number of hip hop and R&B artists such as Major Lazer, Rihanna, Jay-Z, Digga D and Unknown T, he has also been credited as an inspiration for the dancehall-infused work of a number of Western artists, including Drake, who has cited Kartel as being one of his "biggest inspirations".

In 2014, Kartel was sentenced to life imprisonment for the murder of his associate Clive "Lizard" Williams. He will be eligible for parole once he has served a minimum of 35 years in prison. Despite being imprisoned, Kartel continues to release new music prolifically, having released over 50 new songs in 2016 alone. His hit song "Fever" was certified gold in June 2020.

Life and career

1993–2008: Rise to prominence 
Vybz Kartel started his career as a teenager, in 1993 with his first recording "Love Fat Woman", which he released on Alvin Reid's label "One Heart" using the moniker "Adi Banton" as homage to Buju Banton. Palmer was later part of the three-member group "Vybz Cartel", keeping the name after the group split up, and became a protege of Bounty Killer. With this group, he claims to have written nearly 30 songs with them, including the song "Gal Clown".

Kartel rose to prominence in 2003 after a string of hits in Jamaica. The year culminated in a pre-planned on-stage clash with Ninjaman at the annual dancehall festival Sting in Kartel's hometown of Portmore. The clash turned violent when Kartel's crewmembers, as well as Kartel himself, threw punches and assaulted Ninjaman onstage. While Kartel's manager initially blamed Ninjaman, Kartel himself quickly apologised to Ninjaman and Sting organizers for the fracas. Four days after the incident, the two artists appeared before the press to announce a settlement of their differences and to end any animosity.

From the beginning to midst of his ongoing career, Kartel released a number of albums through the UK based label Greensleeves Records, such as Up 2 Di Time, More Up 2 Di Time, and J.M.T.. He established his own label Adidjahiem/Notnice Records with his business partner and producer Ainsley "Notnice" Morris. After splitting with Bounty Killer-led Alliance in 2006, Kartel joined the Portmore Empire, a group of dancehall DJs and singers from his Portmore neighborhood that he signed to his newly founded Adidjahiem/Notnice Records. The members included Popcaan, Deva Bratt (founder), Gaza Slim, Shawn Storm, Sheba, Gaza Indu, Tommy Lee, Singing Maxwell, Singa Blinga, Lenny Mattic, Lisa Hype, Gaza Kim, Blak Ryno, Jah Vinci, Dosa Medicine and Merital Family.

In 2008, Corey Todd, an American business man, signed Vybz Kartel to an endorsement deal for Vybz Rum. The relationship between Todd and Kartel developed into a business partnership. Together they launched Daggerin Condom and Street Vybz Rum. Todd then purchased Jamaica's most popular dancehall nightclub Asylum, which became the home to their weekly event called Street Vybz Thursday.
Street Vybz Rum production was stopped in 2011 because of a disagreement between Kartel and Todd. However, the collaboration resumed in 2012 as the two settled their differences, and despite Kartel's ongoing incarceration.

2009–2013: Crossover and imprisonment 
In 2009 his song featuring Jamaican deejay Spice, "Romping Shop", debuted on the Billboard Top 100 Singles chart, and "Dollar Sign" was in regular rotation on urban radio stations in the US.
His 2010 single "Clarks" was one of his biggest international successes, remaining in the top three reggae singles and gaining the most radio plays in North America for 40 weeks. "Clarks" was also featured on the TV series So You Think You Can Dance Canada, and on a CNN segment on dancehall dance. When his singles "Clarks", "Clarks 2 (Clarks Again)" and "Clarks 3 (Wear Weh Yuh Have)" in 2010, its sales numbers and prices in Jamaica increased considerably. In 2011, he released his own shoe line, named Addi's, as well as his own line of "cake soap", a type of soap primarily used for clothes. Cake soap is less commonly utilised for skincare, to treat skin conditions such as acne. However, Kartel's brand was intended for the purpose of skin lightening or bleaching.

MTV's Vice Guide to Dancehall featured Kartel at his weekly dance party, Street Vybz Thursday. Vybz Kartel has also hosted his own reality television show "Teacha's Pet" on CVM Jamaica broadcast channel, the first reality television show hosted by a dancehall artist in Jamaica. The premise of "Teacha's Pet" found 20 women living in a Kingston house vying for the artist's affection; the show's lascivious content elicited condemnation of its sponsor, telecommunications company LIME. The show came to a halt with the artist's arrest on murder charges in September 2011.

Charges and conviction
On 29 September 2011, Kartel was arrested by police for cannabis possession. Jamaica's Major Investigation Taskforce (MIT) later charged him with the murder of Jamaican businessman Barrington Burton, conspiracy and illegal possession of a firearm. While in prison in 2012, his book The Voice Of The Jamaican Ghetto: Incarcerated but not Silenced, co-written with business associate Michael Dawson, was published.

Though Kartel was granted bail for the Burton murder on 23 March 2012, for JMD$3,000,000, he remained in prison in connection with a second murder, of Clive 'Lizard' Williams, of Waterford, St Catherine. He was charged, along with two others including Vanessa "Gaza Slim" Saddler, with perverting the course of justice, after Saddler allegedly claimed that Williams had robbed her in order to mislead the police into believing that he was still alive. Kartel's trial was originally scheduled for 21 January 2013, but had to be postponed due to a lack of jurors, and was rescheduled for 11 July.

On 24 July, a jury found Kartel not guilty of the charge of murder of Barrington Burton. However, Kartel remained in custody pending the second murder case. His trial for the murder of Clive Williams started on 18 November 2013, and on 13 March 2014, he was found guilty by an eleven-member jury (10-1) of the murder of 27-year-old Clive ‘Lizard’ Williams. The 65-day trial was said to have been the longest in Jamaica's history. On 3 April 2014, Kartel was sentenced to life imprisonment. Justice Lennox Campbell said he would be eligible for parole after serving 35 years.

2014–present: Music from prison 
Since his incarceration in 2011, Vybz Kartel has been releasing new music prolifically. Jamaican prison officials have denied allowing him recording privileges, and Kartel has refused to state the exact source of the recordings, whose lyrical content includes current events.

In 2016, while in prison, Kartel released his most internationally successful album, King of the Dancehall, which peaked at number 2 on the US Billboard Reggae Charts. The album included the single "Fever" which topped various local music charts and became his most successful on streaming websites.

Kartel re-teamed with Kingston Story producer Dre Skull for the single "Real Bad Gal" in 2017. Two of his seven children, have continued his musical legacy, as Jaheim, also known as Little Vybz, and Akheel Raheim Palmer, also known as Little Addi, have been releasing music since 2014 as a duo known as PG 13 (also known as Kartel Sons). In 2019, both were featured on the "Fully Gaza" riddim, on separate songs, with Likkle Vybz teaming with father Vybz on the title track "Fully Gaza", while Likkle Addi performs solo on "Dolla Sign" which interpolates portions of the chorus from his father's single of the same name, on the Goodlife riddim, from 2009.

In January 2020, Kartel released a 10 track album, "To Tanesha", which was dedicated to his ex-girlfriend and mother of his three children, Tanesha Johnson.  They co-produced the album with their respective record labels: Short Boss Muzik and Vybz Kartel Muzik. On 26 June 2020, Kartel released his fifteenth studio album, Of Dons & Divas. He also appeared on Busta Rhymes' 2020 album Extinction Level Event 2: The Wrath of God.

Exactly six years later on 3 April 2020, a three-member panel of judges in the Jamaican Court of Appeal reaffirmed Kartel's conviction.  On 17 April 2020, the Court of Appeal reduced Kartel's parole eligibility to 32 years and 6 months, citing Justice Campbell's failure to consider time the singer had spent in jail while awaiting trial in 2014.  Kartel will now be eligible for parole in 2046.

Personal life
Vybz Kartel's first child was born on 18 April 2003, when he was 27 years old. This child, along with two other children, he had with longtime girlfriend Tanesha 'Shorty' Johnson. Kartel also has six more children from other relationships. On 17 May 2020, it was revealed that Kartel's 15-year-old son was expecting a child with an 18-year-old woman, making Vybz a grandfather for the first time.

Skin whitening
Kartel has come under controversy over perceived skin whitening, or "bleaching", leading him to claim the use of "cake soap" to lighten his skin. The Blue Power Group, Jamaican manufacturer of the popular cake soap (or "blue soap"), has refuted claims it changes skin color. Kartel stated the soap used to lighten his skin was his own company brand, which he intended to release on the local market and to overseas clients.

Controversies

Kartel's 2004 UK MOBO award nomination was withdrawn amidst controversy over homophobic content of his lyrics. As described by Rolling Stone, Kartel is "credited with helping to erode Jamaica’s long-held taboo against oral sex by singing about blow jobs."
In September 2011, the National Communications Network of Guyana banned Vybz Kartel from the airwaves—the first such action against a specific artist. NCN spokesman Martin Goolsarran said his music contained "obscene lyrics" and brought "nothing positive" to the entertainment industry, on Wednesday, 21 September after a week of internal debate. He said NCN was reviewing the lyrics of other musicians and could ban them as well.

Feud with Mavado
A public feud between Kartel and former collaborator Mavado arose towards the end of 2006, stemming from Vybz' much publicised departure from the dancehall conglomerate group The Alliance. The feud resulted in numerous diss tracks released, in which each artist dissed the other and their associates over popular dancehall rhythms. In a police-overseen press conference in March 2007, both Mavado and Vybz Kartel publicly announced an end to hostilities and apologized to fans.

However, by the summer of 2008, tensions flared with a renewal of "diss tracks" from each artist, and a lyrical clash between the two at Sting 2008 left mixed views as to the "winner".

Most of 2009 saw a continuation of the public feud, which dominated Jamaican media and, to a certain extent, Jamaican culture, with the two artists' factions, Gaza (Kartel) and Gully (Mavado), being adopted by Jamaican youth, in some cases leading to street violence.

On 8 December 2009, Kartel and Mavado met with Jamaican Prime Minister Bruce Golding in an attempt to end the feud, which had by that time fueled mob attacks in some of the inner-city neighbourhoods of Kingston. The two had performed together on-stage the previous night in a sign of goodwill at the West Kingston Jamboree, a concert promoted by drug lord Christopher "Dudus" Coke. After the truce in December 2009, the two artists were scheduled to perform a unity concert in March 2010 in Barbados, which was later cancelled by Barbadian Prime Minister David Thompson.

Awards
 2003
 Stone Love's 30th Anniversary
 DJ of the Year 2005
 2008
 CUMA (Caribbean Urban Music Awards)
 2009
 EME Awards
 Male DJ of the Year
 Lyricist/Songwriter of the Year
 Song of the Year (Romping Shop ft. Spice)
 2010
 EME Awards

Nominations
 Source
 VIBE
 UK MOBO awards

Discography

Albums

Extended plays
 2009: GAZA
 2010: Raw - EP
 2011: The Gaza Don
 2011: Colouring Book
 2012: Stronger We Get
 2012: Amsterdam
 2012: Mentally Free
 2013: Time To Be Free
 2021: X-Rated
 2022: True Religion

Riddim Albums 
Vybz Kartel has featured on more than 900 riddims/rhythms from various producers worldwide throughout his career.

Singles

As featured artist

Guest appearances

References

1976 births
Living people
Jamaican dancehall musicians
Jamaican people convicted of murder
Jamaican prisoners and detainees
Jamaican rappers
Jamaican reggae musicians
Musicians from Kingston, Jamaica
People convicted of murder by Jamaica
Prisoners and detainees of Jamaica
Reggae fusion artists
Greensleeves Records artists